Janaka Sampath Perera (born 25 December 1987) is a Sri Lankan cricketer. He made his first-class debut for Badureliya Sports Club in the 2008–09 Premier Trophy on 30 January 2009. In August 2018, he was named in Kandy's squad the 2018 SLC T20 League.

References

External links
 

1987 births
Living people
Sri Lankan cricketers
Badureliya Sports Club cricketers
Sri Lanka Army Sports Club cricketers
Place of birth missing (living people)